Cuban Americans ( or cubanoamericanos) are Americans who immigrated from or are descended from immigrants from Cuba, regardless of racial or ethnic origin. Cuban Americans are the third largest Hispanic American group in the United States after Mexican Americans and Puerto Rican Americans.

Many metropolitan areas throughout the United States have significant Cuban American populations. Florida (1.53 million in 2017) has the highest concentration of Cuban Americans in the United States. Over 850,000 Cuban-Americans reside in Miami-Dade County, where they are the largest single ethnic group and constitute a majority of the population in many municipalities. Florida is followed by California (110,702), New Jersey (99,987), Texas (86,183) and New York (78,478).

Greater Miami has by far the highest concentration of Cuban Americans of any metropolitan area, followed by New York City; Tampa, Florida; Union County and North Hudson, New Jersey areas, particularly Union City, Elizabeth, West New York, Houston, Texas, and Chicago, Illinois. With a population of 141,250, the New York metropolitan area's Cuban community is the largest outside Florida. Nearly 70% of all Cuban Americans live in Florida.

Immigration

Early migrations
Before the Louisiana Purchase and the Adams–Onís Treaty of 1819, Spanish Florida and other possessions of Spain on the Gulf Coast west of the Mississippi River were provinces of the Captaincy General of Cuba. Consequently, Cuban immigration to regions that would eventually form the United States have a long history, beginning in the Spanish colonial period in 1565 when the settlement of St. Augustine was established by Pedro Menéndez de Avilés and hundreds of Spanish soldiers and their families moved from Cuba to St. Augustine to establish new lives.

Thousands of Cuban settlers also immigrated to Louisiana between 1778 and 1802 and Texas during the period of Spanish rule. Since 1820, the Cuban presence was more than 1,000 people. In 1870 the number of Cuban immigrants increased to almost 12,000, of which about 4,500 resided in New York City, about 3,000 in New Orleans and 2,000 in Key West. The causes of these movements were both economic and political, which intensified after 1860, when political factors played the predominant role in emigration, as a result of deteriorating relations with the Spanish metropolis.

1869 marked the beginning of one of the most significant periods of emigration from Cuba to the United States, again centered on Key West. The exodus of hundreds of workers and businessmen was linked to the manufacture of tobacco. The reasons are many: the introduction of more modern techniques of elaboration of snuff, the most direct access to its main market, the United States, the uncertainty about the future of the island, which had suffered years of economic, political and social unrest during the beginning of the Ten Years' War against Spanish rule. It was an exodus of skilled workers, precisely the class in the island that had succeeded in establishing a free labor sector amid a slave economy.

The manufacture of snuff by the Cuban labor force, became the most important source of income for Key West between 1869 and 1900.

Tampa was added to such efforts, with a strong migration of Cubans, which went from 720 inhabitants in 1880 to 5,532 in 1890. However, the second half of the 1890s marked the decline of the Cuban immigrant population, as an important part of it returned to the island to fight for independence. The War accentuated Cuban immigrant integration into American society, whose numbers were significant: more than 12,000 people.

Key West and Tampa, Florida 
In the mid- to late 19th century, several cigar manufacturers moved their operations to Key West to get away from growing laboral and political problems. Many Cuban cigar workers followed. The Cuban government had even established a grammar school in Key West to help preserve Cuban culture. There, children learned folk songs and patriotic hymns such as "La Bayamesa", the Cuban national anthem.

In 1885, Vicente Martinez Ybor moved his cigar operations from Key West to the town of Tampa, Florida to escape labor strife. Ybor City was designed as a modified company town, and it quickly attracted thousands of Cuban workers from Key West and Cuba. West Tampa, another new cigar manufacturing community, was founded nearby in 1892 and also grew quickly. Between these communities, the Tampa Bay area's Cuban population grew from almost nothing to the largest in Florida in just over a decade, and the city as a whole grew from a village of approximately 1000 residents in 1885 to over 16,000 by 1900.

Both Ybor City and West Tampa were instrumental in Cuba's eventual independence. Inspired by revolutionaries such as Jose Martí, who visited Florida several times, Tampa-area Cubans and their sympathetic neighbors donated money, equipment, and sometimes their lives to the cause of Cuba Libre. After the Spanish–American War, some Cubans returned to their native land, but many chose to stay in the U.S. due to the physical and economic devastation caused by years of fighting on the island.

Other early waves (1900–1959) 
Several other small waves of Cuban emigration to the U.S. occurred in the early 20th century (1900–1959). Most settled in Florida and the northeast U.S. The majority of an estimated 100,000 Cubans arriving in that time period usually came for economic reasons (the Great Depression of 1929, volatile sugar prices and migrant farm labor contracts), but included anti-Batista refugees fleeing the military dictatorship, which had pro-U.S. diplomatic ties. During the '20s and '30s, emigration from Cuba to U.S. territory, basically comprised workers looking for jobs, mainly in New York and New Jersey. They were classified as labor migrants and workers, much like other immigrants in the area at that time. Thus migrated more than 40,149 in the first decade, encouraged by U.S. immigration facilities at the time and more than 43,400 by the end of the 30s.

Subsequently, the flow of Cubans to the United States fluctuated, due to both the domestic situation in the 40s and 50s in Cuba, and U.S. immigration policies, plus intermittent anti-immigrant sentiment. Cuban Migration in those years included, in addition to workers, a small mass of the population who could afford to leave the country and live abroad. The U.S. was considered a favored destination by the Cuban bourgeoisie and the middle classes of society, to send their children to school, take vacations and bring some of their capital to establish small and medium-sized businesses.

The Cuban population officially registered in the United States for 1958 was around 125,000 people including descendants. Of these, more than 50,000 remained in the United States after the revolution of 1959.

Post-1959 revolution (1959–present) 

After the Cuban revolution led by Fidel Castro in 1959, a Cuban exodus began as the new government allied itself with the Soviet Union and began to introduce communism. The first Cubans to come to America after the revolution were those affiliated with former dictator Fulgencio Batista, next were Cuba's professionals. Most Cuban Americans that arrived in the United States initially came from Cuba's educated upper and middle classes centered in Cuba's capital Havana. This middle class arose in the period after the Platt Amendment when Cuba became one of the most successful countries in Latin America. Between December 1960 and October 1962 more than 14,000 Cuban children arrived alone in the U.S. Their parents were afraid that their children were going to be sent to some Soviet bloc countries to be educated  and they decided to send them to the States as soon as possible.

This program was called Operation Peter Pan (Operacion Pedro Pan). When the children arrived in Miami they were met by representatives of Catholic Charities and they were sent to live with relatives if they had any or were sent to foster homes, orphanages or boarding schools until their parents could leave Cuba. From 1965 to 1973, there was another wave of immigration known as the Freedom Flights. In order to provide aid to recently arrived Cuban immigrants, the United States Congress passed the Cuban Adjustment Act in 1966. The Cuban Refugee Program provided more than $1.3 billion of direct financial assistance. They also were eligible for public assistance, Medicare, free English courses, scholarships and low-interest college loans.

Some banks pioneered loans for exiles who did not have collateral or credit but received help in getting a business loan. These loans enabled many Cuban Americans to secure funds and start up their own businesses. With their Cuban-owned businesses and low cost of living, Miami, Florida and Union City, New Jersey (dubbed Havana on the Hudson) were the preferred destinations for many immigrants and soon became the main centers for Cuban-American culture. According to author Lisandro Perez, Miami was not particularly attractive to Cubans prior to the 1960s.

It was not until the exodus of the Cuban exiles in 1959 that Miami started to become a preferred destination. Westchester within Miami-Dade County, was the area most densely populated by Cubans and Cuban Americans in the United States, followed by Hialeah in second.

Communities like Miami, Tampa and Union City, which Cuban Americans have made their home, have experienced a profound cultural impact as a result, as seen in such aspects of their local culture as cuisine, fashion, music, entertainment and cigar-making.

1980s

Another large wave (an estimated 125,000 people) of Cuban immigration occurred in the early 1980s with the Mariel boatlifts. Most of the "Marielitos" were people wanting to escape from economic stagnation.

Fidel Castro sent some 20,000 criminals directly from Cuban prisons, as well as mentally ill persons from Cuban mental institutions, with the alleged double purpose of cleaning up Cuban society and poisoning the USA. Those people were labeled "inadmissible" by the US government, and with time, through many negotiations, have been returned to Cuba.

Mid-1990s to 2000s

Since the mid-1990s, after the implementation of the "Wet feet, dry feet" policy immigration patterns changed. Many Cuban immigrants departed from the southern and western coasts of Cuba and arrived at the Yucatán Peninsula in Mexico; many landed on Isla Mujeres. From there Cuban immigrants traveled to the Texas-Mexico border and found asylum. Many of the Cubans who did not have family in Miami settled in Houston; this has caused Houston's Cuban-American community to increase in size. The term "dusty foot" refers to Cubans emigrating to the U.S. through Mexico. In 2005 the Department of Homeland Security had abandoned the approach of detaining every dry foot Cuban who crosses through Texas and began a policy allowing most Cubans to obtain immediate parole.

Jorge Ferragut, a Cuban immigrant who founded Casa Cuba, an agency that assists Cuban immigrants arriving in Texas, said in a 2008 article that many Cuban immigrants of the first decade of the 21st century left due to economic instead of political issues. By October 2008 Mexico and Cuba created an agreement to prevent immigration of Cubans through Mexico.

In recent years, Puerto Rico has become a major drop-off point for Cubans trying to reach the United States illegally. As a U.S. Commonwealth, Puerto Rico is seen as a stepping stone for Cubans trying to get to the continental U.S., though Puerto Rico itself is home to a number of Cubans.

Immigration policy
Before the 1980s, all refugees from Cuba were welcomed into the United States as political refugees. This changed in the 1990s so that only Cubans who reach U.S. soil are granted refuge under the "wet foot, dry foot policy".  While representing a tightening of U.S. immigration policy, the wet foot, dry foot policy still affords Cubans a privileged position relative to other immigrants to the U.S.  This privileged position is the source of a certain friction between Cuban Americans and other Latino citizens and residents in the United States, adding to the tension caused by the divergent foreign policy interests pursued by conservative Cuban Americans. Cuban immigration also continues with an allotted number of Cubans (20,000 per year) provided legal U.S. visas.

According to a U.S. Census 1970 report, Cuban Americans were present in all fifty states. But as later Census reports demonstrated, the majority of Cuban immigrants settled in Miami-Dade County. Emigration from Cuba began to slow down in the late 1990s. Meanwhile, second-generation Cuban Americans increasingly moved out of urban enclaves like Little Havana and settled in suburban areas like Westchester, while those urban areas came to be inhabited by immigrants from other Latin American nations.

In late 1999, U.S. news media focused on the case of Elián González, the six-year-old Cuban boy caught in a custody battle between his relatives in Miami and his father in Cuba. The boy's mother died trying to bring him to the United States. On April 22, 2000, immigration enforcement agents took Elián González into custody. González was returned to Cuba to live with his father.

On January 12, 2017, President Barack Obama announced the immediate cessation of the wet feet, dry feet policy. The Cuban government agreed to accept the return of Cuban nationals. Beginning with the United States–Cuban Thaw in 2014, anticipation of the end of the policy had led to increased numbers of Cuban immigrants.

Demographics
In the census in 2000 there were 1,241,685 Cuban Americans, and in the 2010 census there were 1,785,547 (both native and foreign born), and represented 3.5% of all Latinos, and 0.58% of the US population. Of the 1,241,685 Cuban Americans, 983,147 were born abroad in Cuba and 628,331 were U.S born. Of the 1.6 million, 415,212 were not U.S citizens. In the 2013 ACS, there were 2,013,155 Cuban Americans. The 2010 US Census shows that 85% of Cuban Americans self-identified as being white. The most recent 2012 Cuban census has the island population at 64.12% white, 26.62% mulatto, 9.26% black, and 0.1% Asian. This means that, according to most estimates non-white individuals make up a lower proportion of the Cuban American population than they do of Cuba itself. Though, the larger Cuban community in Florida is more white in comparison to the more mixed-race Cuban community that historically settled the New York/New Jersey area.

Ancestry

The ancestry of Cuban Americans is primarily from Spaniards and Africans, as well as more distant ancestry from among the indigenous peoples of the Caribbean and those of Florida. During the 18th, 19th and early part of the 20th century, there were waves of Spanish immigration to Cuba (Castilians, Basques, Canarians, Catalans, Andalusians, Asturians and Galicians). Canarians immigrated to many countries along the Caribbean from Louisiana to Venezuela. But Cuba was the Latin American culture most influenced by the emigration of Canary Islanders (they developed the production of sugar in Cuba), and Cuban Spanish is closest to that of the Canary Islands. Canary Islanders were viewed by other Spanish-Cubans as superstitious but also hard-working. Some of Haiti's white population (French) migrated to Cuba after the Haitian War of Independence in the early 18th century.  Also, minor but significant ethnic influx is derived from diverse peoples from Middle East places such as Lebanon and Palestine.

There was also a significant influx of Jews, especially between the World Wars, from many countries, including Sephardi Jews from Turkey and Ashkenazi Jews from Poland, Germany and Russia. Other Europeans that have contributed include Britons, Italians, Germans, Swedes and Hungarians. Many Chinese also arrived in Cuba as indentured laborers and they formerly boasted the largest Chinatown in Western Hemisphere as most Chinese Cubans left for Florida.

U.S. states with largest Cuban-American populations

US metropolitan areas with largest Cuban populations
The largest populations of Cubans are situated in the following metropolitan areas (Source: Census 2020):

 Miami-Fort Lauderdale-West Palm Beach, FL MSA – 1,240,468
 New York-Northern New Jersey-Long Island, NY-NJ-PA-CT MSA – 140,391
 Tampa-St. Petersburg-Clearwater, FL MSA – 115,542
 Los Angeles-Long Beach-Santa Ana, CA MSA – 50,702
 Orlando-Kissimmee-Sanford, FL MSA – 49,724
 Las Vegas-Paradise, NV MSA – 31,150
 Houston-Sugar Land-Baytown, TX MSA – 25,997
 Chicago-Joliet-Naperville, IL-IN-WI MSA – 20,633
 Atlanta-Sandy Springs-Marietta, GA MSA – 19,648
 Washington-Arlington-Alexandria, DC-VA-MD-WV MSA – 15,527

U.S. communities with high percentages of people of Cuban ancestry

The top 25 US communities with the highest percentage of people claiming Cuban ancestry are (all of which are in Florida while the top 22 are in Miami-Dade County):
 Hialeah, Florida 80%
 Westchester, Florida 78%
 Coral Terrace, Florida 76.7%
 West Miami, Florida 75.9%
 University Park, Florida 73.9%
 Olympia Heights, Florida 72.9%
 Tamiami, Florida 71.1%
 Hialeah Gardens, Florida 70%
 Medley, Florida 68.9%
 Sweetwater, Florida 65%
 Palm Springs North, Florida 64.2%
 Miami Lakes, Florida 62.2%
 Kendale Lakes, Florida 60.9%
 Fontainebleau, Florida 56.4%
 Miami, Florida 52%
 Miami Springs, Florida 45%
 Richmond West, Florida 41%
 Coral Gables, Florida 38.2%
 Virginia Gardens, Florida 32.1%
 South Miami Heights, Florida 31.70%
 Kendall, Florida 31%
 Miami Beach, Florida 30%
 Ybor City, Florida 28.2%
 West Tampa, Florida 28.1%
 Surfside, Florida 20.15%

U.S. communities with the most residents born in Cuba
For total 101 communities, see the reference given.
Top 20 U.S. communities with the most residents born in Cuba are (all of which are located within the Miami Florida area):
 Hialeah, Florida 64.5%
 Westchester, Florida 60.8%
 Coral Terrace, Florida 56.9%
 West Miami, Florida 56.5%
 South Westside, FL 54.3%
 University Park, Florida 53.1%
 Hialeah Gardens, Florida 52.5%
 Medley, Florida 50%
 Tamiami, Florida 49.7%
 Olympia Heights, Florida 48.2%
 Sweetwater, Florida 48.2%
 Westwood Lakes, Florida 44.9%
 Sunset, Florida 38.7%
 Fontainebleau, Florida 38.3%
 North Westside, FL 36.4%
 Miami, Florida 36.3%
 Miami Lakes, Florida 34.1%
 Palm Springs North, Florida 32.8%
 Kendale Lakes, Florida 32.7%
 Kendale Lakes-Lindgren Acres, FL 31.3%

According to the 2023 American Community Survey, there were 1,800,900 immigrants from Cuba in the US, the top counties of residence being:

 Miami-Dade, Florida - 925,000
 Broward, Florida - 80,400
 Hillsborough, Florida - 75,000
 Palm Beach, Florida - 44,100
 Harris, Texas - 29,900
 Lee, Florida - 28,700
 Collier, Florida - 24,300
 Clark, Nevada - 23,300
 Orange, Florida - 23,100
 Hudson, New Jersey - 21,100
 Los Angeles, California - 19,300
 Jefferson, Kentucky - 16,000
 Union, New Jersey - 9,600
 Maricopa, Arizona - 8,300
 Bergen, New Jersey - 8,000

According to the 2017-2021 American Community Survey, there were 1,313,200 immigrants from Cuba in the US, the top counties of residence being:

 Miami-Dade, Florida - 683,800
 Hillsborough, Florida - 61,900
 Broward, Florida - 61,400
 Palm Beach, Florida - 37,000 
 Lee, Florida - 29,000
Harris, Texas - 26,200
Clark, Nevada - 21,700
Collier, Florida - 20,400
Orange, Florida - 19,800
Hudson, New Jersey - 19,200

 Los Angeles, California - 16,200
 Jefferson, Kentucky - 11,900
 Duval, Florida - 7,700
 Pinellas, Florida - 7,600
 Union, New Jersey - 6,800

Culture

Assimilation 

Many Cuban Americans have assimilated themselves into the American culture, which includes Cuban influences.

Cuban Americans live in all 50 states, Washington, D.C. and Puerto Rico, which received thousands of anti-Castro refugees as well in the 1960s. Since the 1980s, Cuban Americans have moved out of "Little Havana" and Hialeah to middle-class suburbs of Miami such as Kendall and Doral, as well as to the more affluent Coral Gables and Miami Lakes. Many new South and Central Americans, along with new Cuban refugees, have replaced the Cuban Americans who have relocated elsewhere in Florida (Fort Lauderdale, Orlando, Tampa Bay and West Palm Beach) and dispersed throughout the nation. Nevertheless, Cubans are still heavily concentrated in Florida, which slows assimilation; according to the 2010 Census, 68% of Cuban Americans still live in Florida.

More recently, there has been substantial growth of new Cuban American communities in places like Louisville, Kentucky, the Research Triangle area of North Carolina, Katy, Texas, and Downey, California; the latter city now has the second-highest percentage of Cubans and Cuban Americans in the Western United States at 1.96% of the population.

Cuban Americans have been very successful in establishing businesses and developing political clout in Miami. Cuban Americans have also contributed to and participated in many areas of American life including academia, business, acting, politics, and literature.

In the last 15 years, due to the growth of interest around the world for genealogy, Cuban genealogy has become a major interest for Cuban Americans and a growing segment in the family research industry. This has complemented assimilation by preserving Cuban and colonial roots, while also adopting American culture and value.

Religion 
Cuban Americans are mostly Roman Catholic, but some Cubans practice syncretic religions (such as Santería or Ifá), which evolved from mixing the Catholic religion with the traditional African religion. There are also many Protestant (primarily Pentecostal) Cubans, with small numbers of syncretist, nonreligious or tiny communities of Jewish and Muslim Cuban Americans. The Protestant movement in Cuba started after the Spanish–American War when many Americans came to Cuba.

Language 

Similar to the 67% of other Latinos, 69% of Cubans under 18 speak a language other than English at home. For Cubans over the age of 18, the percent speaking a language other than English at home climbs to 89%, which is higher than the 80% among other Latino groups.

Only 12% of Cubans under the age of 18 speak English less than very well, which is much lower than the 20% among other Latino groups. While roughly half of all Cuban-Americans indicate that they feel more proficient in Spanish, around 60% of all Cuban-Americans do speak English proficiently. 36% of all Cuban-Americans consider themselves bilingual. The choice of many Cuban-Americans to utilize Spanish in the home connects to the desire of Cuban-Americans to retain their ethnic heritage. While many Cuban-Americans are open to some assimilation into American culture, ultimately they still consider themselves a unique group of people who bear their own traditions and perspectives.

Food and drink 

Cuban food is varied, though rice is a staple and commonly served at lunch and dinner.  Other common dishes are arroz con pollo (chicken and rice), pan con bistec (steak sandwich), platanos maduros (sweet plantains), lechon asado (pork), yuca (cassava root), flan, batido de mamey (mamey milkshake), papayas and guava paste.

A common lunch staple is the Cuban sandwich (sometimes called a mixto sandwich), which is built on Cuban bread and was created and standardized among cigar workers who traveled between Cuba and Florida (especially Ybor City) around the turn of the 20th century.

Cuban versions of pizza contain bread, which is usually soft, and cheese, toppings, and sauce, which is made with spices such as Adobo and Goya onion. Picadillo, ground beef that has been sautéed with tomato, green peppers, green olives, and garlic is another popular Cuban dish. It can be served with black beans and rice, and a side of deep-fried, ripened plantains.

Beverages 

Cuban coffee is popular in the Cuban-American community. Cubans often drink cafe cubano: a small cup of coffee called a cafecito (or a colada), which is traditional espresso coffee, sweetened with sugar, with a little foam on top called espumita. It is also popular to add milk, which is called a cortadito for a small cup or a cafe con leche for a larger cup. Also, a cortadito is 50% milk and 50% coffee, while a cafe con leche has more milk than coffee (about 75%/25%)

A common soft drink is Materva, a Cuban soda made of yerba mate. Jupiña, Ironbeer and Cawy lemon-lime are soft drinks that originated in Cuba.  Since the Castro era, they are also produced in Miami. Other famous Cuban drinks include guarapo de caña.

A popular drink of Cuban origin is the Cuba Libre, a mix of Cuban rum and cola, usually Coca-Cola and mojitos.

Politics

Until the early 2010s, Cuban Americans historically tended to be more Republican than Democratic, thanks to the anti-communist foreign policy platform of the Republican Party since the 1950s. The failed Bay of Pigs invasion left many Cubans distrustful of the Democratic Party, blaming John F. Kennedy for his handling of the 1961 Bay of Pigs Invasion. Cuban exiles began an alliance with the Republican Party of Florida. In Florida, Cuban-American congressmen have tended to be Republican, beginning with Representative Ileana Ros-Lehtinen (Joe Garcia, a Democrat, is an exception). The presence of Cubans in the Republican Party was highlighted by the 2016 presidential race, which featured U.S. Senators Ted Cruz and Marco Rubio as prominent candidates, both of whom are of Cuban descent. But in New Jersey, another state with many Cuban Americans, Cuban-American congressmen have tended to be Democrats, for example, Representative Albio Sires and Senator Bob Menendez. Ronald Reagan is particularly popular in the Cuban-American community for standing up to Soviet communism and Fidel Castro's so-called "exportation of revolution" to Central America and Africa (there is a street in Miami named for Reagan), and George W. Bush received 75 and 78 percent (in 2000 and 2004 respectively) of the Cuban-American vote. The Cuban-American lobby has also lobbied both parties on causes important to Cuban Americans.

In recent years, the Cuban-American vote has become more contested between the parties. In the 2008 United States presidential election, Democrat Barack Obama received 47% of the Cuban-American vote in Florida. According to Bendixen's exit polls, 84% of Miami-Dade Cuban-American voters 65 or older backed John McCain, while 55% of those 29 or younger backed Obama. In 2012, Barack Obama received 49 percent of the Cuban-American vote in Florida, compared to 47 percent for Mitt Romney according to Edison Research exits polls. By spring 2014, this trend increased among Cuban American voters having a preference for Democratic Party candidates increased particularly for younger voters aged 18–49, increasing to some 56% for the younger voter demographic, versus Cuban-American voters over 50 years of age having a 39% preference for Democratic candidates. As in the 2012 United States presidential election, Mitt Romney got more support than Barack Obama. The 2016 United States presidential election saw Donald Trump garner about the same level support within the community, garnering 50–54 percent of the Floridian Cuban-American vote, as opposed to 41–48 percent for Hillary Clinton, as some Cuban Americans were dissatisfied with Obama's Cuba policy, which restored foreign relations with the Cuban government.

In regards to the 2020 United States presidential election in Florida, Trump increased his level of support with younger Cuban Americans. In the aftermath of Trump attempting to overturn the election and the subsequent storming of the U.S. Capitol on January 6, 2021, a report by Foreign Policy alleged that Cuban Americans within Miami were among the most ardent believers of his conspiracy theories. Cuban-Americans were the 2nd largest non-White ethnic group to have been arrested for the Jan 6, 2021 Capitol riot behind Filipino Americans.

Socioeconomics
The median household income for U.S.-born Cuban Americans is $57,000, higher than the overall U.S. median household income of $52,000.

However, the median annual personal earnings for foreign born Cuban Americans is $25,000, which is lower than that of US population at $30,000.  Around 20% of Cuban-Americans live in poverty, compared to 25% of Latinos generally and 16% of non-Hispanic Americans. The ability of the average Cuban-American to out-earn the average Latino makes it easier for Cuban-Americans to avoid poverty. Historically, Cuban-Americans have also enjoyed greater benefits due to their "refugee" status within U.S. immigration policy. These benefits, such as those provided by the Cuban American Act of 1966, have allowed Cuban-Americans to enjoy an easier time of navigating economic obstacles.

Education
Among U.S.-born Cuban Americans, 36% have a college degree or higher, compared to 30% for the overall U.S. population. Of foreign-born Cuban Americans, 27% have a college degree. This is higher than the U.S. Latino population (14%) but lower than that of the overall U.S. population. According to the Pew Research Center, Cuban-Americans 25 or older who emigrated to the United States after 1990 have the highest graduation rate, at 26%. According to this same data, Cuban-Americans 25 or older who entered the United States before 1980 had a graduation rate of 24%, while those entering between 1980 and 1990 had a graduation rate of 13%. The decline in graduation rate from 1980 to 1990 can in part be attributed to the presence of Afro-Cubans among immigrants, who generally favor more poorly in multiple areas due to systemic inequalities in Cuba. Almost half of all Cuban-Americans have at least a high school diploma.

Notable Cuban Americans

In the United States Congress
Ten Cuban Americans currently serve in the United States Congress. There have been eleven Cuban-American US representatives elected from Florida, two from New Jersey and New York, and one each from Texas, Ohio and West Virginia.

Three United States Senators:
 Ted Cruz, Republican, Texas (2013–present)
 Bob Menendez, Democrat, New Jersey (2006–present), Member of the U.S. House of Representatives from New Jersey's 13th district (1993–2006)
 Marco Rubio, Republican, Florida, (2011–present)

Seven are United States Representatives:
 Mario Díaz-Balart, Republican, Florida's 21st congressional district (2011-2013), and Florida's 25th congressional district (2003-2011) (2013–present) 
 Anthony Gonzalez, Republican, Ohio's 16th District (2019–present) 
 Alex Mooney, Republican, West Virginia's 2nd district (2015–present)
 Albio Sires, Democrat, New Jersey's 13th congressional district (2006–2013), and New Jersey's 8th congressional district (2013–present)
 Maria Elvira Salazar, Republican, Congresswoman from Florida's 27th Congressional District (2021–present)
 Carlos A. Gimenez, Republican, Congressman from Florida's 26th Congressional District (2021–present)
 Nicole Malliotakis, Republican, Congresswoman from New York's 11th Congressional District (2021–present)

Former Congressmen:
 Carlos Curbelo, Republican, Florida's 26th district (2015–2019)
 Lincoln Díaz-Balart, Republican, Miami, U.S House of Representatives (1993–2011)
 Joe Garcia, Democrat, Florida's 26th congressional district (2013–15)
 Mel Martínez, Republican, U.S Senator from Florida (2005–09)
 David Rivera, Republican, Miami, U.S House of Representatives (2011–13)
 Ileana Ros-Lehtinen, Republican, Florida's 27th congressional district (1989–2019), first Cuban-American elected to Congress

In state government
Cuban Americans have had much success at the state level. In Florida, where Cuban-American legislators hold more seats than anywhere else in the nation, pro-democracy, anti-Castro, and anti-Chavez legislation is often promoted and passed even though states cannot dictate foreign policy. Even in states where Cuban Americans are not concentrated in large numbers they have had successes especially in New Jersey, where albeit a tiny minority concentrated in Union City, Elizabeth, and Newark, they have had enormous political successes.

In Florida:
 Frank Artiles, Republican, former Member of the Florida House of Representatives from the 118th district
 José Félix Díaz, Republican, former Member of the Florida House of Representatives from the 116th district
 Manny Díaz, Jr., Republican, Member of the Florida House of Representatives from the 103rd district
 Miguel Díaz de la Portilla, former Republican, Member of the Florida Senate from the 40th district
 Anitere Flores, Republican, former Member of the Florida Senate from the 37th district
 Erik Fresen, Republican, Member of the Florida House of Representatives from the 114th district
 Ileana Garcia, Republican, Member of the Florida Senate from the 37th district (2020–Present)
 René García, Republican, Member of the Florida Senate from the 38th district
 Eduardo Gonzalez, Republican, Member of the Florida House of Representatives from the 111th
 Carlos Lopez-Cantera, Republican, former Lieutenant Governor of Florida, (2014–2019)
 Jeanette Núñez, Republican, Lieutenant Governor of Florida, (2019–present), Former Member of the Florida House of Representatives from the 119th district
 José R. Oliva, Republican,  Member of the Florida House of Representatives from the 110th district
 Ana Maria Rodriguez, Republican, Member of the Florida Senate from the 39th district (2020–Present)
 José Javier Rodríguez, Democrat, Member of the Florida Senate from the 37th district (2016-2020), House of Representatives from the 112th district (2012-2016)
 Mike La Rosa, Republican, Member of the Florida House of Representatives from the 42nd district
 Carlos Trujillo, Republican, Member of the Florida House of Representatives from the 105th district

In New Hampshire:
 John H. Sununu, Republican, Governor of New Hampshire, (1983–1989)
 Christopher T. Sununu, Republican, Governor of New Hampshire, (2017–present)

In New Jersey:
 Marlene Caride. Democrat, New Jersey
 Carmelo Garcia, Democrat, New Jersey
 Angelica Jimenez, Democrat,  Member of the New Jersey General Assembly from the 32nd Legislative District (2012–present)
 Vincent Prieto, Democrat, Speaker of the New Jersey General Assembly (2014–present), Member of the New Jersey General Assembly from the 32nd Legislative District (2004–present)

In New York:
 Nicole Malliotakis, Republican, Staten Island, Member of the New York General Assembly from the 64th district

In Connecticut:
 Art Linares, Republican, Westbrook, Member of the Connecticut State Senate from the 33rd district

In Nevada:
 Moises "Mo" Denis, Democrat, Member of the Nevada Senate from the 2nd district

In Virginia:
 Jason Miyares, Republican, Virginia Beach, Member of the Virginia House of Delegates from the 82nd district and Attorney General of Virginia (2022–present)

Eduardo Aguirre (R) served as Vice Chairman of the Export-Import Bank of the United States in the George W. Bush administration and later named Director of Immigration and Naturalization Services under the Department of Homeland Security. In 2006, Eduardo Aguirre was named US ambassador to Spain. Cuban Americans have also served other high-profile government jobs including White House Chief of Staff John H. Sununu (R) Mauricio Claver-Carone serves as the President of the Inter-American Development Bank.

Florida-based businessman and Cuban exile Elviro Sanchez made his multimillion-dollar fortune by investing the proceeds of his family's fruit plantations. He is one of the most low-profile philanthropists in the Southern States.

Judicial positions:

 Danny Boggs is a judge on the United States Court of Appeals for the Sixth Circuit (1986–present)
 Barbara Lagoa is currently a judge on the United States Court of Appeals for the Eleventh Circuit (2019–present)
 Jorge Labarga is currently a judge on the Florida Supreme Court (2009–present)
 John D. Couriel is currently a judge on the Florida Supreme Court (2020–present)
 Raoul G. Cantero, III, served as a justice on the Florida Supreme Court. (2002–2008)

Notable people

Television and entertainment

Singers, songwriters and musicians

Athletes

See also 

 List of Cuban Americans
 Cuban Canadians
 Cubans in Miami
 Cubans
 Cuban British
 White Cubans
 Spanish Americans
 Afro-Cubans
 Latinos
 History of Cuban Americans
 White Latino Americans
 White Latin Americans
 Black Latino Americans
 Afro-Latin Americans
 Cuba–United States relations
 Cuban immigration to the United States
 History of Ybor City
 Cuban exile
 United States embargo against Cuba
 Isleños
 Canarian people
 CubaOne Foundation
 Cuban-American lobby

General:
 Diaspora politics in the United States
 Hyphenated American

Notes

References

Further reading
 Álvarez-Borland, Isabel. Cuban-American Literature and Art: Negotiating Identities (State University of New York Press, 2009).
 Bishin BG, Klofstad CA. "The Political Incorporation of Cuban Americans: Why Won't Little Havana Turn Blue?" Political Research Quarterly. 2012;65(3):586-599.
 Boswell, Thomas D., and James R. Curtis. The Cuban American Experience: Culture, Images, and Perspectives (Rowman and Allanheld, 1983).
 Buffington, Sean T. "Cuban Americans". in Gale Encyclopedia of Multicultural America, edited by Thomas Riggs, (3rd ed., vol. 1, Gale, 2014), pp. 591–605. online
 De la Garza, Rodolfo O., et al. Latino Voices: Mexican, Puerto Rican, and Cuban Perspectives on American Politics (Westview Press, 1992).
 De La Torre, Miguel A., La Lucha for Cuba: Religion and Politics on the Streets of Miami, (University of California Press, 2003).
  Interviews with Cuban-American women in Miami about Cuban-American identity.
 García, María Cristina. Havana USA: Cuban Exiles and Cuban Americans in South Florida, 1959–1994 (U of California Press, 1996).
 González-Pando, Miguel. The Cuban Americans (Greenwood Press, 1998).
 Herrera, Andrea O'Reilly, ed. Remembering Cuba: Legacy of a Diaspora (U of Texas Press, 2001).
 Kami, Hideaki, "Ethnic Community, Party Politics, and the Cold War: The Political Ascendancy of Miami Cubans, 1980–2000", Japanese Journal of American Studies (Tokyo), 23 (2012), 185–208.
 Gustavo Pérez Firmat, Life on the Hyphen: The Cuban-American Way. Austin: The University of Texas Press, 1994. Rpt. 1996, 1999. Revised and expanded edition, 2012.
 Portes, Alejandro and Alex Stepick. City on the Edge: The Transformation of Miami (U of California Press, 1993).

External links 
  Cuban American National Foundation (CANF)
 Cuban American National Council (CNC)
 Andres Schipani, "Expats Flock to Cuba as U.S. Reforms Spark A Party", The Observer, May 31, 2009
 The Cuban Heritage Collection at the University of Miami
 "Cubans in Miami, an historical perspective"
  Center for Cuban Studies (CCS), providing resource materials to educational and cultural institutions.

 
Hispanic and Latino American
 
 
Cuba–United States relations
Caribbean American
Cuban diaspora